Thallomys is a genus of rodent in the family Muridae endemic to Africa.  It contains four species:

Loring's rat (Thallomys loringi)
Black-tailed tree rat (Thallomys nigricauda)
Acacia rat (Thallomys paedulcus)
Shortridge's rat (Thallomys shortridgei)

References

 
Rodent genera
Taxa named by Oldfield Thomas